"Shoot High Aim Low" is a song by Yes. It appears on the band's 1987 album, Big Generator. The song reached position #11 on the Mainstream Rock Tracks chart in the 1980s. It appeared on every show on the Big Generator tour, but nowhere else to date.

Meaning
The song, according to Jon Anderson's announcements on many shows of the tour, is about war; specifically, a future in which mankind will live beyond war. In most of these announcements, Anderson explains that the "blue fields" mentioned in the first line are in Nicaragua. At the time the album was being worked on, a legal battle between the U.S. and Nicaragua had occurred over U.S. aid to anti-government guerrillas.

Anderson also explains on some occasions that Trevor Rabin, who performs lead vocals on the song (alternating with Anderson) is singing in "dreamtime", while Anderson is singing in real time.

Live performances
In live performances, the song usually appeared just prior to "Big Generator". It would typically last, discounting announcements, for about 8 minutes 30 seconds. Rabin's electric guitar solo was somewhat extended live, but typically only by a short amount of time. By November 22, 1987, this song was performed after "Big Generator."

A live version can be found on the live box set The Word is Live.

Personnel
 Jon Anderson – vocals
 Chris Squire – bass guitar, backing vocals
 Trevor Rabin – guitar, lead and backing vocals, keyboards, mixing, production, string arrangements
 Tony Kaye – keyboards
 Alan White – drums, percussion
 Trevor Horn – production

Notes and references

Yes (band) songs
Anti-war songs
1987 songs
Songs written by Jon Anderson
Songs written by Trevor Rabin
Songs written by Chris Squire
Song recordings produced by Trevor Horn
Songs written by Alan White (Yes drummer)